Anna Ustinova is a Russian mountain bike orienteer.

At the 2006 World MTB Orienteering Championships in Joensuu she won a gold medal in the relay, together with Ksenia Chernykh and Nadia Mikriukova.

References

Russian orienteers
Female orienteers
Russian female cyclists
Mountain bike orienteers
Year of birth missing (living people)
Living people
Place of birth missing (living people)